Frosch is a German surname. Notable people with the surname include:

Carl Frosch, Bell Labs researcher
Leslie Frosch, American curler
Reinhold Frosch, Austrian luger
Robert A. Frosch (born 1928), American scientist
Walter Frosch (1950–2013), German footballer

See also
Mount Frosch, a mountain of Antarctica
German term for Bow frog, sometimes appearing in musical instructions
German company Werner & Mertz uses a Frosch trademark

German-language surnames